A geometric stable distribution or geo-stable distribution is a type of leptokurtic probability distribution. Geometric stable distributions were introduced in Klebanov, L. B., Maniya, G. M., and Melamed, I. A. (1985). A problem of Zolotarev and analogs of infinitely divisible and stable distributions in a scheme for summing a random number of random variables. These distributions are analogues for stable distributions for the case when the number of summands is random, independent of the distribution of summand, and having geometric distribution. The geometric stable distribution may be symmetric or asymmetric. A symmetric geometric stable distribution is also referred to as a Linnik distribution. The Laplace distribution and asymmetric Laplace distribution are special cases of the geometric stable distribution. The Mittag-Leffler distribution is also a special case of a geometric stable distribution.
 
The geometric stable distribution has applications in finance theory.

Characteristics

For most geometric stable distributions, the probability density function and cumulative distribution function have no closed form. However, a geometric stable distribution can be defined by its characteristic function, which has the form:

 

where .

The parameter , which must be greater than 0 and less than or equal to 2, is the shape parameter or index of stability, which determines how heavy the tails are. Lower  corresponds to heavier tails.

The parameter , which must be greater than or equal to −1 and less than or equal to 1, is the skewness parameter.  When  is negative the distribution is skewed to the left and when  is positive the distribution is skewed to the right.  When  is zero the distribution is symmetric, and the characteristic function reduces to:

 .

Although  determines the skewness of the distribution, it should not be confused with the typical skewness coefficient or 3rd standardized moment, which in most circumstances is undefined for a geometric stable distribution.

When  = 2,  = 0 and  = 0 (i.e., a symmetric geometric stable distribution or Linnik distribution with =2), the distribution becomes the symmetric Laplace distribution with mean of 0, which has a probability density function of:

 .

However, for  the variance of the geometric stable distribution is infinite.

Relationship to stable distributions

Geometric stable distributions have a similar property, but where the number of elements in the sum is a geometrically distributed random variable. In other words:

The distribution is strictly geometric stable only if the sum  equals the distribution of the 's for some a.

There is also a relationship between the stable distribution characteristic function and the geometric stable distribution characteristic function.  The stable distribution has a characteristic function of the form:

 

where

The geometric stable characteristic function can be expressed in terms of a stable characteristic function as:

See also 
Mittag-Leffler distribution

References

 
Continuous distributions
Probability distributions with non-finite variance